The steamboat Yosemite operated for almost fifty years on San Francisco Bay, the Sacramento River, inland coastal waters and the lower Fraser River in British Columbia, and Puget Sound.

Design
Yosemite was built in 1862 at the yard of John Gunder North, in San Francisco.  For a vessel built entirely of wood, Yosemite was enormous.  She was 282' long after her rebuild following the 1865 boiler explosion, when 30' was added to her length., 35' beam (80' over the paddle guards) and 13' depth of hold, and rated at 1525 tons.  She was a side-wheel steamer built entirely of wood with a single-cylinder  "walking-beam" steam engine with a 57" bore and a 122" stroke. Another source gives slightly different dimensions: 283.2' long, 34.8' on the beam, 13.6' depth of hold, and 1,319 tons. Her paddle wheels were 32' in diameter and fitted with 10' long "buckets" (the maritime world for the wooden planks fitted to the wheel that acted as paddles)  Turner, one of the most prominent Pacific Northwest maritime historians, described Yosemite as follows:

Service in California

Yosemite was first placed in service by the California Steam Navigation Company in 1863 to run with Chrysopolis on the Sacramento River. Daily service, Sundays excepted, was provided from San Francisco leaving at 4pm for Sacramento.  On October 12, 1865, as she was leaving the Rio Vista landing bound down river, her boiler (supposedly a safer "low-pressure" model) exploded, killing 55 people and scalding and injuring many more. She was equipped with new boilers then, and once again in 1876, after which she could reach a speed of  an hour. Railroad competition in California forced her to be laid up at Oakland from 1879 to 1883.

Purchase by Canadian Pacific Navigation Company

In 1883, John Irving Commodore of the Canadian Pacific Navigation Company, bought Yosemite from her then owners, the Central Pacific Railroad and brought her up to Vancouver to be one of the first vessels of the line.

Canadian operations
Yosemite proved to be a good purchase for Commodore Irving. Despite her reputation arising from the 1865 boiler explosion, Yosemite ran in Canadian waters for many years without significant trouble. In 1883, she set a speed record of four hours and 20 minutes for the  run from Vancouver to Victoria, which stood until 1901, when the transpacific liner Moana made the run in four hours and one minute.  In those times, ships were subject to health quarantines, in particular for smallpox.  Officials were sometimes too quick to declare a smallpox quarantine, which happened twice in July 1892 to Yosemite. Twice she was barred at Vancouver from landing passengers coming from Victoria and each time she simply landed them further up Burrard Inlet. Court action was necessary to persuade the Vancouver officials to allow Yosemite to land in their city.

Purchase by Canadian Pacific Railway
In 1901, the Canadian Pacific Railway purchased all the steamship operations and vessels of the Canadian Pacific Navigation Company, including Yosemite, which with other older steamers of the line was placed in reserve to fill in for newer ships taken out for service, and to cover times of high traffic such as in the summer months. By this time, Yosemite was almost 40 years old.

Sale to Puget Sound excursion lines

In 1906, the Canadian Pacific Railway sold Yosemite to the Puget Sound Excursion Company. This company had been organized by Capt. Thomas Grant to run cruises and excursions out of Seattle in connection with the Alaska–Yukon–Pacific Exposition. Once in Seattle, Yosemite was rebuilt somewhat by John B. Mitchell. The main deck and social hall were extended all the way forward to be flush with the bow, and a large dancing pavilion was installed.

By the spring of 1907, Yosemite was in operation under command of Captain Grant, carrying up to 1,000 passengers at a time from Seattle to Bremerton and around Bainbridge Island. Music was provided by Wagner's Band and food service by Lord and Meeks, a well-known Seattle catering firm.

The surviving photographs of Yosemite seem to always show an astounding number of people on her decks.

Among other trips, in 1908, Yosemite carried almost the entire student body of the University of Washington out into Puget Sound to greet the Great White Fleet.  In this particular trip, the vessel was obviously grossly overloaded, as the weight of the passengers caused her to heel so sharply over to port that the water came up to the bottom of the port side paddle wheel guard.

Boxing matches were held on her lower deck. Perhaps somewhat incongruously with hosting boxing matches, Yosemite on July 20, 1907 or 1908, advertised a "Grand Temperance Excursion" tickets $1.00 each "under the auspices of the International Order of Good Templars":

Another typical charter excursion was carrying the Georgetown Volunteer Fire Department, who were all employees of the Rainier Brewery. In one atypical incident, in August, 1907, Yosemite rammed  into a dock in Seattle, knocking over a horse and wagon, apparently becoming the only paddlewheeler to collide with a harnessed horse.

Wrecked

Yosemite was wrecked on July 9, 1909 at Port Orchard Narrows, in broad daylight. The circumstances of the wreck were never entirely cleared up. Striking ground, her back was broken and she was a total loss. The captain said he expected the current to strike her differently than it did. Although there were over 1,000 people on board, no one was killed or drowned, with the passengers and crew being taken on board the steamer Transport, the first on the scene, with Inland Flyer and Norwood standing by.

Yosemite had recently been sold to real estate promoter C. D. Hillman. He later was sent to prison, and this gave rise to talk and accusations that she had been wrecked recklessly or even deliberately for insurance. This doesn't seem to square with the facts, as it would have required the collusion not only of her master, but also the pilot and two quartermasters who struggled to hold the ship on course, and strong tidal currents had wrecked and continue to wreck vessels.

External links

Photograph of Yosemite in California service
Rawls, James J., ed. and Orsi, Richard J., ed., A Golden State: Mining and Economic Development in Gold Rush California (California History Sesquicentennial Series, 2), at 257, University of California Press 1999  (showing Yosemite departing San Francisco with another apparently similar sidewheeler still at the dock) (accessed 2/24/2008)

Historic images from on-line collection of the University of Washington
Yosemite late in her career following 1907 reconstruction

Historic images from the British Columbia Provincial Archives

Websites

Notes

Victorian-era merchant ships of Canada
Merchant ships of the United States
Paddle steamers of British Columbia
Steamboats of Washington (state)
Sidewheel steamboats of Washington (state)
Steamboats of California
Shipwrecks of the Washington coast
Ships of CP Ships
California Steam Navigation Company